The Kisilyakh Range is a mountain range in the Sakha Republic, Far Eastern Federal District, Russia. The nearest city is Batagay, and the nearest airport Batagay Airport.

The mountains are topped by kigilyakh rock formations. Kisilyakh means "Mountain having a man" or "Mountain married" in the Yakut language.

Geography
The Kisilyakh Range rises at the northeastern end of the Chersky Range, in the Sakha region. The mountains are of middle height and the range is one of the smallest of the system. The range consists of two ridges divided into an eastern and western part by a cleft.

The Khadaranya and the Ymiysky ranges, other northern subranges of the Chersky Mountains, rise further to the east, beyond the Nenneli, a tributary of the Oldzho river. The Kurundya Range rises to the east and southeast. The Adycha River flows across the range in its western part and the Tuostakh, one of its main tributaries, to the south.

See also
Kigilyakh

References

External links
sentstory.ru / Yakutia, Kisilyakh
Landscapes as a reflection of the toponyms of Yakutia
Yakutia, Verkhoyansk District
Mountain ranges of the Sakha Republic
Chersky Range
Tourist attractions in the Sakha Republic

sah:Киһилээх